The Kemény K-02 Szellő was a Hungarian training glider from the late 1940s. It was originally designed for a national contest to build a primary trainer but when this was won by the Rubik R-16 Lepke it was resigned to have more advanced soaring capability which could take pilots to their Silver C badge. Ninety were produced.

Design and development

In 1948 the Hungarian National Aviation Association (Országos Magyar Repülö Egyesület or OMRE) announced a competition for single seat and two seat primary glider  trainer designs. The winning single-seater was the Rubik R-16 Lepke, with Sandor Kemény's K-01 in second place. The following year gave Kemény an opportunity to build his design. So as to avoid competition with the R-16 he redesigned it into the K-02, with the help of György Mező from OMRE, so that it could ridge soar even in light winds.

The prototype of the K-02 Szellő  was built by MÁV Istvántelki Főműhely (Istvántelki Workshop of the Hungarian Railways), first flying on 10 September 1949.

The Szellő was an all-wood, high wing, pod and boom design. Its wing had a rectangular inner section extending out to about half span, followed by tapered outer panels with most sweep on their trailing edges. There was a single main spar with plywood ahead of it around the leading edge, forming a torsion resistant D-box. Plywood also covered the wing ahead of an internal, diagonal drag strut on each side. Elsehere the wing was fabric-covered.  Broad, parallel chord Frise-type ailerons filled the trailing edges of the outer panels. The prototype used a mixture of strut and wire bracing but the latter was omitted on the production K-02b Szellő. Each bracing strut ran from the bottom of the fuselage to the spar at 25% span. The prototype K-02 had no airbrakes but production K-02bs had Rubik-type brakes which had three horizontal close-spaced metal channels in both lower and upper brakes, each channel fitting within the next for compact retraction.

The pod was based upon a strong keel bearing transverse frames and with stringers strengthening its smooth, oval cross-section, plywood skin. The pilot's open cockpit below the wing leading edge also was supported by the keel. Behind the cockpit a four-sided box converged aft to triangular frames which supported the wing spar and the tail boom, giving the rear of the pod a near vertical but slightly forward leaning edge. There was a rubber-sprung landing skid under the keel. The prototype had another, short, skid at the rear of the pod but production Szellős landed on a semi-recessed,  landing wheel.

The Szellő's ply-covered tailboom tapered slightly in plan rearwards but maintained its depth to the tail, where it included an integral, steep-edged and round-topped fin, a low step for the strut-braced tailplane and a small tail bumper. The round-tipped tailplane was only slightly tapered, as were the elevators, which had a deep cut-out for rudder movement and a port side trim tab. Its rudder was generous, slightly angular and reached down to the tail bumper.

Operational history

The first production Szellő, built by Sportárutermelő V., Esztergo  flew on 20 August 1950. In all 89 were built and flew on into the 1960s, enabling many Hungarian glider pilots to gain their Silver-C.

Variants

K-02Sole prototype, built by MÁV Istvántelki Főműhely (Istvántelki Workshop of the Hungarian Railways)
K-02bProduction model. Bracing wires removed, landing wheel and air brakes added. 89 built by Sportárutermelő V., Esztergom.

Specifications (K-02b)

References

Aircraft first flown in 1949
1940s Hungarian sailplanes
High-wing aircraft